Bogdan Stanisław Łysak (12 May 1936 – 16 December 2022) was a Polish engineer and politician. A member of the Alliance of Democrats, he served in the Sejm from 1976 to 1985.

Łysak died on 16 December 2022, at the age of 86.

References

1936 births
2022 deaths
Polish engineers
Members of the Polish Sejm 1976–1980
Members of the Polish Sejm 1980–1985
Alliance of Democrats (Poland) politicians
Wrocław University of Economics alumni
Knights of the Order of Polonia Restituta
Politicians from Kielce